Action This Day may refer to:

Action This Day (horse), American Champion Thoroughbred racehorse
Action This Day (song), by Queen 
Action This Day (memo), Churchills' stamp on a famous memo sent to Churchill in 1941; when he required priority for Bletchley Park requirements.
Action This Day; Working With Churchill a memoir by Lord Normanbrook